The Spirit Duties Act 1735 (commonly known as the Gin Act of 1736) was an Act of the Parliament of Great Britain establishing a retail tax on gin and annual licenses for gin sellers. Designed to curb gin consumption, the law was widely disobeyed and then repealed in 1743.

Background
Gin consumption in the United Kingdom increased markedly during the late 17th and early 18th centuries during the so-called Gin Craze. As consumption continued to grow, gin began to be blamed for a variety of social ills including crime, prostitution and mental illness.

Pushed forward by social reformers such as Joseph Jekyll, The Gin Act of 1736 attempted to curb gin consumption by instituting a 20 shilling per gallon excise tax as well as a £50 annual license (equivalent to £ today) for all gin sellers. Passed in 1735, it was set to take effect in September 1736. The law proved immensely unpopular and provoked public rioting. King George II issued a proclamation requiring compliance with the law and an end to public disorder against it. After just a year, though, enforcement began to wane and the public began to defy the law more openly. It is said that only two of the annual licenses were ever purchased. Moonshine also became widespread as people produced their own gins, sometimes using dangerous ingredients such as turpentine and sulfuric acid.

The financial strain of the War of the Austrian Succession also played a role as the government sought a solution which would generate more income. The act was repealed by the Gin Act of 1743 which set much lower taxes and fees.

References

Alcohol law in the United Kingdom
Great Britain Acts of Parliament 1735